This article lists the bridges and tunnels in Dublin and the Greater Dublin Area in Ireland.  The bridges are ordered sequentially upstream, from mouth to source.  For lists that are not in table format, alternative or historical names are in curved brackets (parentheses) and traversing roads or rails are in square brackets.

Bridges over the Liffey
Bridges over the River Liffey in Greater Dublin, from east to west.

Bridges over the River Liffey outside Greater Dublin, from east to west.
 Sewage treatment works bridge
 Leixlip Bridge [Leixlip Road]
 M4 motorway
 New Bridge [R404]
 Liffey Bridge (Celbridge Bridge) [Dublin Road, Celbridge]
 A footbridge immediately to the south of the road bridge in Celbridge
 Rock Bridge [footbridge at Celbridge Abbey]
 Straffan Bridge
 A truss bridge just west of Straffan Bridge
 The Bridge at 16 [19th century wrought iron pedestrian suspension bridge crossing the south channel of the river to the 17th tee in the Kildare Hotel and Golf Club]
 A bridge crossing the north channel of the river 60 metres from The Bridge at 16
 An agricultural access bridge west of The K Club
 Alexandra Bridge [Clane]
 Millicent Bridge [near Sallins]
 Leinster Aqueduct Grand Canal crossing
 Railway bridge, MP 19 [Dublin to Cork railway crossing]
 Caragh Bridge [Caragh]
 Victoria bridge (L2030)
 Newbridge College footbridge
 Saint Conleth's bridge, Newbridge
 M7 Motorway
 L2032 at Athgarvan
 M9 Motorway
 Castlemartin Bridge
 Kilcullen Bridge or The Bridge, Kilcullen (Bridge), County Kildare
 R412
 Old bridge at Brannockstown
 R411 Ballymore Eustace
 Poulaphouca bridge
 R758 Burgage Moyle Bridge
 Ballyward Bridge L8375
 Ballusmuttan Bridge L4377
 R759
 Liffey Head Bridge

Bridges on the Grand Canal
Bridges on the Grand Canal from the River Liffey to the south and west.  In addition, many of the canal locks allow for pedestrian crossing.

Bridges on the Royal Canal
Bridges on the Royal Canal from the River Liffey to the north and west.  Many of the bridges include a rail crossing for the rail lines adjacent to the canal in much of Dublin.  In addition, many of the canal locks allow for pedestrian crossing and several pedestrian bridges are located adjacent to Iarnród Éireann railway stations.

North Wall Quay Scherzer bascule bridge [North Wall Quay - R801]
Spencer Dock Bridge [Mayor Street] - LUAS bridge.
Sheriff St. Lifting Bridge (inoperable) [Sheriff Street - R101]
Ossory Road railway bridge (actually three independent bridges) [DART bridge]
Railway bridge [lifting bridge]
Newcomen Bridge [North Strand Road - R105]
Clarke's Bridge [Summerhill Parade, Ballybough Road - R803]
Footbridge for access to Croke Park
Clonliffe Bridge (Russell Street Bridge) [Russell Street, Jones's Road]
Binns Bridge [Drumcondra Road - R132]
Cross Guns Bridge (Westmoreland Bridge) [Phibsborough Road, Prospect Road - R135]
Blaquiere Bridge over the former city spur of the Royal Canal [North Circular Road - R101]
New Cabra Road - R147
Connaught Street
Railway bridge at Liffey Junction
Broom Bridge (Broome Bridge, Brougham Bridge) [Broombridge Road]
Ratoath Road bridge- R805
Reilly Bridge (Reily's Bridge)
Railway tunnel
Railway bridge at Liffey Junction
Longford Bridge [Ashtown Road - L3101]
Dunsink Lane Bridge [New River Road]
Ranelagh Bridge [disused]
Roundabout of Junction 6 of M50 motorway - two bridges
Royal Canal aqueduct over the M50 motorway
Talbot Bridge [Old Navan Road]
Granard Bridge [Castleknock Road - R806]
Kirkpatrick Bridge [Carpenterstown Road, Coolmine Road]
Dr. Troy Bridge [Diswellstown Road - L3036]
Porterstown Bridge [Porterstown Road - L3035]
Kennan Bridge (Neville Bridge) [Porterstown Road]
Callaghan Bridge (Carhampton Bridge) R121
Railway bridge
Pakenham Bridge (Barberstown Bridge)
Collins Bridge [Barnhill Crossroads - L3005]
Royal Canal passes into County Kildare
Cope Bridge [Captain's Hill - R149]
Royal Canal aqueduct over the Rye Water
Louisa Bridge R148
R449
Deey Bridge
Pike Bridge [L5053]
Mullen Bridge [Straffan Road - R406]
Footbridge
Bond Bridge [Parson Street, Clane Road - R408]
Royal Canal aqueduct over the River Lyreen
Jackson's Bridge

Bridges over the River Dodder
Bridges over the River Dodder from the River Liffey to the southwest.

Upstream of Fort Bridge the river flows through the Bohernabreena Water Works. There are a number of bridges, but it is not clear which channels are the Dodder and which are not. Upstream of the Water Works, there are a number of feeder streams and it is debatable which one is the Dodder.

Bridges over the River Tolka
Bridges over the River Tolka from the River Liffey to the northwest.

Bridge to East Point Business Park
M50 Motorway
John McCormack Bridge - R834
Dublin to Belfast railway line
Fairview Park Footbridge
Annesley Bridge - R105
Luke Kelly Bridge (Ballybough Bridge) - R803
Distillery Road Bridge [foot bridge]
Frank Flood Bridge (previously 'Drumcondra Bridge' until 2018)
Two footbridges in Griffith Park
Dean Swift Bridge (St. Mobhi Bridge) [St. Mobhi Road]
Glasnevin Bridge
Footbridge in Botanic Gardens
Tolka Bridge (Finglas Bridge)
Finglaswood Bridge
Cardiff's Bridge
Ashtown Bridge
M50 Motorway

Other bridges
Bow Bridge over the River Camac (Cammock) connecting Irwin Street and Bow Lane West
William Dargan Bridge, a Luas Green Line bridge over the R112 and R117 regional roads and the Slang River
Golden Bridge over the River Camac at the Tyrconnell Road end of Emmet Road, Inchicore.
Knocksedan Bridge over the River Ward west of Swords on the Naul Road
Broadmeadow Estuary Bridge of the M1 over the Broadmeadow Estuary near Swords
Mayne Bridge over the Mayne River at its mouth in northern Baldoyle on the Coast Road
O'Connell Bridge, St Stephen's Green, crossing the lake in the park.
Portmarnock Bridge over the River Sluice just west of Portmarnock on the Strand Road
Scotchstone Bridge over the River Ward in Swords
Wellfield Bridge over the Mayne River north of Donaghmede near The Hole in the Wall Road
Wooden Bridge connecting Clontarf Road with the western end of North Bull Island

Tunnels
Dublin Port Tunnel
Phoenix Park Tunnel
Railway tunnel under the Royal Canal
Grand Canal Sewer Tunnel
Liffey Service Tunnel

See also
List of bridges in the Republic of Ireland
List of Dublin Gates
List of rivers in County Dublin
List of streets and squares in Dublin
Streets and squares in Dublin
Transport in Dublin

References

Sources
Dublin City Map Dublin: ERA-Maptec Ltd., 1992.
Liddy, Pat. Secret Dublin. Lincolnwood, Illinois: Passport Books, 2001.
M'Cready, Rev. C.T. Dublin Street Names: Dated and Explained. Dublin: Carraig Books, 1892.
Ordnance Survey Ireland. Dublin City and District Street Guide. Phoenix Park, Dublin: Government of Ireland, 2002.
Ordnance Survey Ireland. Dublin City Centre Street Atlas. Phoenix Park, Dublin: Government of Ireland, 1999.

External links
Bridges of Dublin Dublin City Council website detailing the history of the 23 bridges across the Liffey
Bridges of Dublin Walking Tour Walking tour of the bridges along the River Liffey

Dublin
Transport in County Dublin
Bridges in County Dublin
Bridges
Dublin bridges
 
Bridges, Dublin
Dublin